The Brownsville Toros are a professional baseball team based in Brownsville, Texas, in the United States. The Toros are a member of the Texas Winter League, which is not affiliated with Major League Baseball. From the 2006 season to the present, the Toros have played their games at Harlingen Field, which hosts all Texas Winter League teams.

Team Record

References

External links
 United League Baseball website
 Texas Winter League website

Texas Winter League teams